This is a survey of the postage stamps and postal history of Greenland.

Greenland is an autonomous country within the Kingdom of Denmark, located between the Arctic and Atlantic Oceans, east of the Canadian Arctic Archipelago.

Pakke-Porto stamps

Stamps were issued by the Kongelige Grønlandske Handel in 1905 for use as parcel stamps. The stamps showed the coat of arms of Greenland, featuring a standing polar bear. Letters were handled free of charge by the Kongelige Grønlandske Handel until 1938.

First stamps

In 1938, postal service was established and the first postage stamps of Greenland were issued on 1 December. The series consisted of five stamps with a portrait of the Danish king Christian X and two with the image of a polar bear.

Later issues
In 1945, during the Second World War, a new set of stamps was printed by the American Bank Note Company. This series consisted of nine values, which in addition to King Christian X, also showed seals, Inuit in a kayak, dog sleds and polar bears.

On March 11, 1969, Greenland issued a stamp dedicated to the 70th birthday of King Frederick IX. For the first time, the name of the country was inscribed in two languages, Danish and Greenlandic.

Local issues

Ivigtut
In 1922, in the town of Ivigtût (located in the southwestern part of Greenland, now abandoned), a green stamp with the image of a polar bear and the inscription “Ivigtut Kryolithbrud Bypost 1922" (Ivigtut Cryolite Mining Local mail 1922) was issued by the local mining company providing mail delivery to the small town.

The legitimacy of these stamps is strongly questioned, and are believed to have been created by American stamp collector Brad Arch in the 1960s.

Thule
Stamps were issued  in 1935 for the remote settlement in Thule, in the northernmost area of Greenland, found by Knud Rasmussen. The series was issued on the 25th anniversary of the founding of the settlement and depicted Knud Rasmussen, the Danish flag, walruses and local scenery. The stamps were valid for mail from Thule to Copenhagen.

See also
Facit Catalog
Postage stamps and postal history of Denmark
Scandinavian Collectors Club
Scandinavia Philatelic Society

References

Further reading
 Gilberg, Rolf. Greenland Seen Through 50 Years of Stamps, 1938-1988. Copenhagen: Kalaallit Allakkeriviat, 1989  122p.
 Hjørne, Torben. Greenland: pakkeporto, stamps, postmarks, letters, parcelcards. Århus: H. Torben, 1985  96p.
 Lidegaard, Mads. Stamps tell the story of Greenland. Nuuk: POST Greenland: Atuakkiorfik, c2000  157p.
 Wowern, Eric v. Greenland: Pakke Porto Stamps 1905-1938. Virum, Denmark: GF Frimaerker, 1987 96p. Series Title: GF catalogue; no. 1.
 Wowern, Eric v. Greenland: The Thule Locals. Virum, Denmark: GF Frimaerker, 1984 40p. Series Title: GF catalogue; no. 4.
 Wowern, Eric v. Greenland: Postage Stamps after 1938: incorporating the postmarks after 1938, formerly listed in GF 6, and also a simplified listing of the pakke-porto stamps 1905-1938. Virum, Denmark: GF Frimaerker, 1990 192p. Series Title: GF catalogue; no. 5.

External links
 Greenland Post

History of Greenland
Philately of Greenland